There are at least 60 named mountains in Carbon County, Montana.
 Bald Knob, el. 
 Bar Hill, el. 
 Bare Mountain, el. 
 Barrys Island, el. 
 Beartooth Mountain, el. 
 Big Pryor Mountain, el. 
 Black Butte, el. 
 Black Butte, el. 
 Black Pyramid Mountain, el. 
 Blanchard Butte, el. 
 Bowback Mountain, el. 
 Burnt Mountain, el. 
 Butcher Mountain, el. 
 Castle Mountain, el. 
 Castle Rock Mountain, el. 
 Church Hill, el. 
 Crazy Mountain, el. 
 Crow Mountain, el. 
 Deer Mountain, el. 
 East Pryor Mountain, el. 
 Elk Mountain, el. 
 Grass Mountain, el. 
 Grizzly Peak, el. 
 Harris Hill, el. 
 Lonesome Mountain, el. 
 Maurice Mount, el. 
 Medicine Mountain, el. 
 Metcalf Mountain, el. 
 Mount Dewey, el. 
 Mount Inabnit, el. 
 Mount Lockhart, el. 
 Mount Peal, el. 
 Mount Rearguard, el. 
 Mount Rosebud, el. 
 Nichols Peak, el. 
 Penney Peak, el. 
 Pika Peak, el. 
 Red Pryor Mountain, el. 
 Rock Island Butte, el. 
 Round Butte, el. 
 Schwend Hill, el. 
 Sheep Mountain, el. 
 Shepard Mountain, el. 
 Silver Run Peak, el. 
 Snowbank Mountain, el. 
 Spirit Mountain, el. 
 Stormitt Butte, el. 
 Summit Mountain, el. 
 Sundance Mountain, el. 
 Sylvan Peak, el. 
 Tempest Mountain, el. 
 The Big Slide, el. 
 Three Sisters, el. 
 Thunder Mountain, el. 
 Tolman Mountain, el. 
 Tolman Point, el. 
 Wapiti Mountain, el. 
 Whitetail Peak, el. 
 Yellow Hill, el. 
 Youngs Point, el.

See also
 List of mountains in Montana
 List of mountain ranges in Montana

Notes

Carbon